The Abbey of Viboldone is an abbey in Viboldone, a frazione of San Giuliano Milanese, in the province of Milan, northern Italy.

History
The abbey was founded in 1176 and completed in 1348 by the Humiliati, an order of monks, nuns and lay people who worked in the abbey producing wool cloths and cultivated the nearby fields with innovative techniques.

After the suppression of the Humiliati by Pope Pius V (1571), the abbey went to the Olivetan Benedictines, who were forced to leave the abbey in 1773, when Lombardy fell in Austrian hands.

After several years of abandonment, the abbey is currently home to the Community of Madre Margherita Marchi (Benedictine nuns) since 1941.

Architecture
The façade (finished in 1348) is hut-shaped, with mullioned windows and visible brickwork with white stone decorations, and divided into three sectors by two semi-columns. The entrance portal is in white marble, and is surmounted by a lunette with marble sculptures of the "Madonna with Child between the Saints Ambrose and John of Meda". At its sides, two Gothic niches houses statues of the Sts. Peter and Paul. The door is in dark wood, and dates to the 14th century.

The bell tower has an appearance similar to that of the façade, with frames in cotto and small arcades at the bases of the double and triple mullioned windows. The latter are surmounted by small circular windows.

The interior is rather sober, with few decorations, aside from the extensive fresco decoration of the  Giottesque school. It has a rectangular hall plan, with a nave and two aisles with five spans each (the first ones in Romanesque style, while the remaining ones are Gothic with cotto columns and high cross vaults). The arches are ogival.

The fresco decoration includes the Madonna in Maestà with Saints and the large Universal Judgement with, in the middle, Jesus and at his left the Damned, overlook by Satan. Other frescoes, depicting Renaissance musical instruments, are housed in the Music Hall, located in a building annexed to the church.

External links

Official website 

Religious buildings and structures completed in 1348
Gothic architecture in Lombardy
Viboldone
Humiliati Order
Olivetan monasteries
Benedictine nunneries in Italy